Pomabamba (possibly from Quechua puma cougar, puma, pampa a large plain, "cougar plain") can refer to:

 Pomabamba, a town in Peru
 Pomabamba Province, a province in the Ancash Region, Peru
 Pomabamba District, a district in the Pomabamba province, Peru
 Pomabamba, a mountain in Peru